Arimannia (from Lombard ari-mann, "man of the army", that is "free man active in the army"; akin German "heer-mann") was - during the Lombard domination in Italy - a group of warriors directly subjected to the King.
The aim of an Arimannia was the defence of an important strategic point.

A free-born arimann was also called baro. The residence of a baro was called baronica or arimannia, his wife was a "freifrau" ( frea  or  wirdibora  = "dignified born"), a son from such a relationship was referred to as a "fully legitimate born" (fulboran).

Although documented only from the 8th century CE, the Arimannia is believed to have existed since the Lombard invasion of Italy.

See also
 Arimannus
 Mannerbund
 Comitatus (classical meaning)
 Fyrd
 Housecarl
 Druzhina
 Thingmen
 Varangian Guard
 Hird

References

Sources

Lombards
Early Germanic warfare